Thitarodes xunhuaensis is a species of moth of the family Hepialidae. It was described by Yang and Yang in 1995, and is known from Qinghai, China.

References

External links
Hepialidae genera

Moths described in 1995
Hepialidae